George Raymond Doucet (born March 28, 1939) is a former high school principal and political figure in Nova Scotia. He represented Halifax Cobequid in the Nova Scotia House of Assembly from 1974 to 1978 as a Liberal. He was born in Quebec City, Quebec, the son of Herbert Louis Doucet and Agnes Boudreau. He was educated there, at St. Francis Xavier University and at the École Normale in Laval, Quebec. In 1961, he married Virginia Ann McMaster. Doucet entered provincial politics in the 1974 election, winning the Halifax Cobequid riding. He served as Speaker of the House of Assembly of Nova Scotia from 1977 to 1978. In the 1978 election, Doucet ran in the new riding of Sackville, and was defeated by Progressive Conservative Malcolm A. MacKay.

References
 Normandin, PG Canadian Parliamentary Guide, 1977

1939 births
Living people
Nova Scotia Liberal Party MLAs
Politicians from Quebec City
St. Francis Xavier University alumni
Speakers of the Nova Scotia House of Assembly
20th-century Canadian politicians
Heads of schools in Canada